Enfield Lock railway station is on the West Anglia Main Line, it is in Enfield Lock in the London Borough of Enfield, London. Its three-letter station code is ENL and it is in Travelcard zone 6.

The station and all trains serving it are operated by Greater Anglia.

Enfield Lock was the main station for the Royal Small Arms Factory until its closure in the late 1980s, and now serves the large housing development on the site known as Enfield Island Village, as well as the nearby Innova Science and Business park.

History
The railway line from Stratford to Broxbourne was opened by the Northern & Eastern Railway on 15 September 1840. The station itself was opened by the Eastern Counties Railway in 1855 as Ordnance Factory, later renamed in 1886 to Enfield Lock.

The lines through Enfield Lock were electrified on 5 May 1969. Prior to the completion of electrification in 1969, passenger services between Cheshunt and London Liverpool Street through Enfield Lock station were normally operated by Class 125 diesel multiple units (which had been purpose-built for the line in 1958).

Services
All services at Enfield Lock are operated by Greater Anglia using  EMUs.

The typical off-peak service in trains per hour is:
 2 tph to London Liverpool Street
 1 tph to 
 2 tph to 
 1 tph to 

On Sundays, the services to Liverpool Street and Bishop's Stortford do not run and station is instead served by a half-hourly service between Stratford and Hertford East.

Connections
London Buses routes 121 and 491 serve the station.

See also
Enfield Town railway station
Enfield Chase railway station

References

External links

Enfield, London
Railway stations in the London Borough of Enfield
Former Great Eastern Railway stations
Railway stations in Great Britain opened in 1855
Greater Anglia franchise railway stations